Aredo is a village in West Papua, Indonesia. The village is located to the southeast of the Bird's Head Peninsula. It lies on the Kuri River.

References

Populated places in West Papua